This is an incomplete list of political and military organisations in Burma.


8
 88 Generation Student Youths (Union of Myanmar) (88GSY)

A - B
 All Burma Federation of Student Unions (ABFSU)
 All Burma Monks' Alliance
 All Burma Students’ Democratic Front (ABSDF)
 All National Races Unity and Development Party (Kayah State) (ANRUDP)
 All Mon Region Democracy Party (AMRDP)
 Assistance Association for Political Prisoners (Burma) (AAPP)
 Arakan League for Democracy (AfD)
 Arakan Liberation Army (ALA)
 Arakan Liberation Party (ALP)
 Asho Chin National Party (ACNP)
 Border Guard Forces (BGF)
 Burma Army ("Tatmadaw." BA)
 Burma Democratic Concern (BDC)
  Burmese Rohingya Association in Thailand (BRAT)

C - I
 Chin National Council (CNC)
 Chin National League for Democracy
 Chin National Front (CNF)
 Chin National Party (CNP)
 Chin National Vanguard Party (CNVP)
 Chin Progressive Party (CPP)
 Committee for Internally Displaced Karen People (CIDKP)
 Communist Party of Burma (CPB)
 Democracy and Peace Party (DPP)
 Democratic Party for Myanmar New Society (DPMNS)
 Democratic Karen Buddhist Army (DKBA)
 Democratic Organisation for Kayan National Unity
 Democratic Party (Myanmar) (DPM)
 Ethnic National Development Party (ENDP)
 Federation of Trade Unions of Burma (FTUB)
 Free Burma Project (FBP)
 Free Burma Rangers (FBR)
 Good Life Club (GLC)
 Human Rights Foundation of Monland (HURFOM)
 The House of Peace and Nonviolence
 Inn National Progressive Party (INPP)
 International Foundation for Burma National Congress (IFBNC)

K
 Kachin Defence Army (KDA)
 Kachin Independence Army (KIA)
 Kachin National Organisation (KNO)
 Kachin State National Congress for Democracy
 Kachin State Progressive Party (KSPP)
 Kaman National Progressive Party (KNPP)
 Karen History and Culture Preservation Society (KHCPS)
 Karen Human Rights Group (KHRG)
 Karen National Defence Organisation (KNDO)
 Karen National Liberation Army (KNLA)
 Karen National Union (KNU)
 KNU/KNLA Peace Council
 Karen Peace Council (KPC)
 Karenni Army (KA)
 Karenni National Progressive Party (KNPP)
 Karenni National People’s Liberation Front (KNPLF)
 Karenni Nationalities People's Liberation Front (KNPLF)
 Karenni National Women's Organisation (KNWO)
 Kayah State Nationalities League for Democracy
 Kayan National Party (KNP)
 Kayan New Land Party (KNLP)
 Kayin People's Party (KPP)
 Kayin State Democracy and Development Party (KSDDP)
 Khami National Development Party (KNDP)
 Kokang Democracy and Unity Party (KDUP)
 Kokang Revolutionary Force (KRF) (or 'Resistance')

L - M
 Lahu National Development Party (LNDP)
 Lahu National United Party (LNUP)
 Manipur rebels
 Modern People Party (MPP)
 Mon National Defence Army (MNDA)
 Mon National Democratic Front (MNDF)
 Mon National Liberation Army (MNLA), the armed wing of the New Mon State Party (NMSP)
 Mon People's Front (MPF)
 Monland Restoration Army (MRA)
 Mong Tai Army (MTA)
 Mro or Khami National Solidarity Organisation (MKNSO)
 Mro National Party (MNP)
 Myanmar Democracy Congress (MDC)
 Myanmar National Democratic and Development Party (MNDDP)
 Myanmar Unity Revolution Supreme Council
 Myanmar Unity Revolutionary Council

N
 Naga National Council (NNC)
 Naga Hills Regional Progressive Party
 National Democratic Alliance Army (NDAA)
 National Democratic Force (NDF)
 National Democratic Front (NDF)
 National Democratic Party for Development (NDPD)
 National Democratic Party for Human Rights
 National Development and Peace Party (NDPP)
 National League for Democracy (NLD)
 National Political Alliances League (NPAL)
 National Reconciliation Program (NRP)
 National Socialist Council of Nagaland (NSCN)
 National Solidarity and Development Party (NSDP)
 National United Front of Arakan (NUFA)
 National Unity Party (NUP)
 New Democratic Army - Kachin (NDAK)
 New Mon State Party (NMSP)
 Noom Suk Harn
 Northern Shan State Progressive Party (NSSPP)

P - R
 Pa-O National Organisation(PNO)
 Palaung National Front (PNF)
 Palaung State Liberation Army (PSLA)
 Party for National Democracy
 People’s New Society Party (PNSP)
 Peace and Diversity Party (PDP)
 Phalon-Sawaw Democratic Party (PSDP)
 Rakhine Nationalities Development Party (RNDP)
 Rakhine State National Force of Myanmar (RSNF)
 Regional Development Party (Pyay) (RDPP)
 Rohingya Youth Development Forum (RYDF) (RYDF)

S - Z
 Shan National Army (SNA)
 Shan National Independence Army (SNIA)
 Shan National United Front (SNUF)
 Shan Nationalities Democratic Party (SNDP)
 Shan Nationalities League for Democracy (SNLD)
 Shan Nationalities People's Liberation Organisation (SNPLO)
 Shan People's Liberation Army (SPLA)
 Shan State Army (SSA)
 Shan State Army - North (SSA-N)
 Shan State Army - South (SSA-S)
 Shan State Independence Army (SSIA)
 Shan State National Army (SSNA)
 Shan State Progress Party (SSPP)
 Shan State Revolutionary Army (SSRA)
 Shan United Army (SUA)
 Shan United Revolutionary Army (SURA)
 Shan State Volunteer Force (SSVF)
 State Law and Order Restoration Council (SLORC), the military dictatorship of Burma
 State Peace and Development Council (SPDC), the military dictatorship of Burma, formerly the SLORC
 Ta-ang (Palaung) National League for Democracy
 Taaung (Palaung) National Party (TPNP)
 Tai Independence Army (TIA)
 Tai National Army (TNA)
 Tai Revolutionary Council (TRC) (or 'Tailand')
 Tai Revolutionary Army (TRA) (or 'Tailand')
 Union Democratic Party (UnionDP)
 Union Election Commissions (UEC)
 Union of Karen/Kayin League (UKL)
 Union of Myanmar Federation of National Politics (UMFNP)
 Union Pa-O National Organisation
 Union Solidarity and Development Party (USDP)
 United Democratic Party (UnitedDP)
 United Shan Patriotic Council (USPC)
 United Wa State Army (UWSA)
 United Wa State Party (UWSP)
 Unity and Democracy Party of Kachin State (UDPKS)
 Vingngun Ka Kwe Ye
 Wa Democratic Party (WDP)
 Wa National Council (WNC)
 Wa National Army (WNA)
 Wa National Organisation (WNO)
 Wa National Unity Party (WNUP)
 Wuntharnu NLD (Union of Myanmar) (WNLD)
 Zomi National Congress (ZNC)

 
Lists of organisations based in Myanmar
org
org